William Declan Byrne Jr. is a retired United States Navy rear admiral who last served as director of warfare development (N72) in the Office of the Chief of Naval Operations. He previously served as the vice director of the Joint Staff. Byrne also served as the 85th Commandant of Midshipmen of the United States Naval Academy from May 2013 to June 2015.

Byrne attended the United States Naval Academy, graduating in 1987 with a B.S. degree in political science. While there, he was a record-setting starting quarterback for three football seasons. Byrne later earned an M.S. degree in National Resource Strategy from the Industrial College of the Armed Forces in 2004.

Awards and decorations

In 2015, Byrne was selected as a co-recipient of the Distinguished American Award by the National Football Foundation and College Football Hall of Fame.

See also
 Navy Midshipmen football statistical leaders

References

 

 

 

Year of birth uncertain
Living people
Navy Midshipmen football players
United States Naval Academy alumni
Dwight D. Eisenhower School for National Security and Resource Strategy alumni
United States Navy admirals
Recipients of the Defense Superior Service Medal
Recipients of the Legion of Merit
Year of birth missing (living people)